was the stage of the Japanese language after Middle Japanese and before Modern Japanese. It is a period of transition that shed many of the language's medieval characteristics and became closer to its modern form.

The period spanned roughly 250 years and extended from the 17th century to the first half of the 19th century. Politically, it generally corresponded to the Edo period.

Background

At the beginning of the 17th century, the center of government moved to Edo from Kamigata under the control of the Tokugawa shogunate. Until the early Edo period, the Kamigata dialect, the ancestor of the modern Kansai dialect, was the most influential dialect. However, in the late Edo period, the Edo dialect, the ancestor of the modern Tokyo dialect, became the most influential dialect, and Japan closed its borders to foreigners. Compared to the previous centuries, the Tokugawa rule brought about much newfound stability. That made the importance of the warrior class gradually fall and replaced it with the merchant class. There was much economic growth, and new artistic developments appeared, such as Ukiyo-e, Kabuki, and Bunraku. New literary genres such as Ukiyozōshi, Sharebon (pleasure districts), Kokkeibon (commoners), and Ninjōbon also developed. Major authors included Ihara Saikaku, Chikamatsu Monzaemon, Matsuo Bashō, Shikitei Sanba, and Santō Kyōden.

Phonology

Consonants
Middle Japanese had the following consonants:

/t, s, z, h/ all have a number of allophones before the high vowels [i, ɯ]:
t →  / __i
t →  / __ɯ
z →  / __i
z →  / __ɯ
h →  / __i
h →  / __ɯ

Several major developments occurred:
/zi, di/ and /zu, du/, respectively, no longer contrasted.
/h/ partially developed from [ɸ] into [h, ç].
/se/ lost its palatalization and became .

Middle Japanese had a syllable final -t, which was gradually replaced by the open syllable /tu/.

Labialization
The labial /kwa, gwa/ merged with their non-labial counterparts into [ka, ga].

Palatalization
The consonants /s, z/, /t/, /n/, /h, b/, /p/, /m/, and /r/ could be palatalized.

Depalatalization could also be seen in the Edo dialect:
 > 
 >  "lord"
 >  "life"

Prenasalization
Middle Japanese had a series of prenasalized voiced plosives and fricatives: .

Grammar

Verbs
Early Modern Japanese has five verbal conjugations:

As had already begun in Middle Japanese, the verbal morphology system continued to evolve. The total number of verb classes was reduced from nine to five. Specifically, the r-irregular and n-irregular regularized as quadrigrade, and the upper and lower bigrade classes merged with their respective monograde. That left the quadrigrade, upper monograde, lower monograde, k-irregular, and s-irregular.

Adjectives
There were two types of adjectives: regular adjectives and adjectival nouns.

Historically, adjectives were subdivided into two classes: those whose adverbial form ended in -ku and those that ended in –siku. That distinction was lost in Early Modern Japanese.

Historically, the adjectival noun was sub-divided into two categories: -nar and -tar. In Early Modern Japanese, -tar vanished and left only -na.

Notes

References 

 
 
 
 
 
 
 

Japanese language
Japanese, 2
Languages attested from the 17th century